The Warburton Lectures (until the end of the nineteenth century often called the Warburtonian Lectures) are a series of theology lectures held in Lincoln's Inn, London. They were established in 1768 with money given by William Warburton, and were intended to bring young divines to the notice of London audiences. The set topic was the proof of Christianity through prophecies.

Lecturers

1768–1772 Richard Hurd
1773–1776 Samuel Hallifax
1777–1780 Lewis Bagot
1781–1785 East Apthorp
1800–1804 Robert Nares
1807 Edward Pearson
1814–1815 Philip Allwood 
1821–1825 John Davison Discourses on Prophecy, in which are considered its structure, use and inspiration (1824)
1829–1832 William Rowe Lyall: his Propædia Prophetica of 1840 returned to the same circle of ideas, though Lyall made a disclaimer that this work was not the text of the lectures
1833–1836 Frederick Nolan
1837–1840 Alexander McCaul
1841–1845 Benjamin Harrison Prophetic Outlines of the Christian Church and the Antichristian Power
1845 John Frederick Denison Maurice The Epistle to the Hebrews
1849–1853 Edward Bishop Elliott The Destinies and Perils of the Church, as Predicted in Scripture
1854–1858 William Goode
1866 Benjamin Morgan Cowie
1870–1874 Edwin Hamilton Gifford Voices of the Prophets
1874 James Woodhouse
1876–1880 Stanley Leathes Old Testament Prophecy: its witness as a record of divine foreknowledge
1880–1884 Alfred Edersheim Prophecy and History in Relation to the Messiah
1884–1885 John Gray Richardson
1886–1890 Alexander Francis Kirkpatrick The Doctrine of the Prophets
1894–1898 Henry Wace Prophecy: Jewish and Christian
1898–1901 Herbert Edward Ryle
1907–1911 Michael George Glazebrook
1911–1915 A. Lukyn Williams, Gospel of Matthew
1915–1919 William Oscar Emil Oesterley
1919 Robert Henry Charles The Decalogue
1927–1931 David Capell Simpson
1931 William Ralph Inge God and the Astronomers

References
Catalogue of the Library of Princeton Theological Seminary (1886), p. 131; https://archive.org/stream/catalogueoflibra00prin#page/130/mode/2up

Notes

Further reading
The Warburton Lectures Delivered at Lincoln's Inn 1985–1994, Honourable Society of Lincoln's Inn, London.
The Warburton Lectures Delivered at Lincoln's Inn 1995–2005, Honourable Society of Lincoln's Inn, London, 2006.

Christian theological lectures
Recurring events established in 1768
1768 establishments in England